Jonah Lomu Rugby is a rugby union video game developed by Rage Software and published by Codemasters in 1997. It was released for MS-DOS, PlayStation and the Sega Saturn. The title refers to former All Blacks winger Jonah Lomu. It was the first rugby union game released on the Saturn or PlayStation platforms.

Following the 2003 closure of Rage Software, several members of the game's development team went on to work on World Championship Rugby.

Gameplay

Jonah Lomu Rugby puts the player in control of real-life national rugby union teams from the 1995 Rugby World Cup, including the 16 finalists and 16 other teams that participated in the qualifying campaign. The game has support for up to four players.

Modes
Jonah Lomu Rugby has five modes: Friendly, World Cup, Tournament, Territories Cup and Classic Matches. The Friendly mode is a single exhibition game in which the player can play against computer-controlled or human opponents. The World Cup mode replicates the 1995 Rugby World Cup format, with the 16 teams arranged into the same four pools as in the real life tournament. Tournament mode is a knockout format contested by either 4, 8 or 16 teams. Territories Cup mode consists of leagues based around geographic location. The Five Nations and Tri Nations competitions feature the same teams competing in the real life equivalents, whilst the American Cup, Asian Cup and Pacific Cup each feature three teams from the areas.

The Classic Matches mode consists of eight scenario matches based on real-life World Cup matches that the player joins in progress with the aim of obtaining a different result to that in real-life.

Development
Rage Software's Trevor Williams recounted: "We wanted a game that stayed true to the rules, but was easy to pick up and play without a complete understanding of all the ins and outs". After work had concluded on the studio's football title Striker '96 he stated that "we could see the potential in the engine in a sprite-based rugby simulation could both look good and run at the right pace", arguing that "using polygons would slow the game too much".

Programmers Tony McCabe and Antonio Argentieri explained that rugby video games are more difficult to make than other sports games, since the heavy specialization of the different players means a number of different AIs need to be designed and programmed to run simultaneously. The scrum was remodeled more than five times in an effort to make it work in play.

Commentary for the game was supplied by Bill McLaren and Bill Beaumont. Rage Software purchased the audio rights to the 1995 Five Nations match between England and France to assist in producing realistic sounds for match play.

The Saturn version was slated for release in June 1997, but the date was pushed back to September. The game was ready by the June date, but Codemasters held it back to coincide with the release of the PC version and the start of the new rugby season.

Reception

Matt Yeo gave a rave review in Sega Saturn Magazine, saying it has "one of the most innovative and easy to use game play systems ever utilised in a sports game". He particularly noted the use of on-screen menus during pauses in the game's action, saying they enable newcomers to more easily come to grips with the game by presenting rugby's complicated rules in a simplified, leisurely form. He also praised the four-player support, audio commentary, and dramatic weather conditions, and gave the game a score of 91%.

Computer and Video Games gave a positive review of the PlayStation version, noting the "brilliantly realistic graphics and a logical control system are the stars here" and awarding the game 4/5.

In 2015, a retrospective review in The Telegraph described Jonah Lomu Rugby as "the greatest computer game the sport has ever seen". The Irish Independent similarly described it as "the best rugby game ever made".

Legacy
A copy of the PlayStation version of the game is included in the Pacific Cultures collection of Te Papa (the national museum of New Zealand).

References

External links
 Jonah Lomu Rugby at GameSpot
 Jonah Lomu Rugby at IGN
 

1997 video games
DOS games
PlayStation (console) games
Rugby union video games
Sega Saturn games
Windows games
Video games set in New Zealand
Codemasters games
Rage Games games
Video games based on real people
Lomu
Lomu
Black people in art
Multiplayer and single-player video games
Video games developed in the United Kingdom